Forshang Buddhism World Center is a new religious movement based in Taiwan.

Beliefs
The following information is according to the organization's website.

The organization claims to have received the "revelation of Buddha-Nature", founded by the Venerable Master Miao Kung Bodhisattva and succeeding Master Yuan Dao Bodhisattva in the early stage of the Republic of China, revering Da Zi Zai Wang Fo (the origin of Buddha-Nature) as the Originator. 

Yuan Dao Bodhisattva was initiated at the age of 14, after twenty years of unrelenting dedication, he became enlightened in 1956, wholeheartedly preaching the Forshang Buddhism doctrines to the full extent ever since. Before passing into Nirvana on August 11, 1993, he chose among disciples around the world Sun-Don Lee as the successor and appointed him as the Master of the third generation.

References

Buddhist new religious movements